Bykovo is a rural locality (a village) in Beketovskoye Rural Settlement, Vozhegodsky District, Vologda Oblast, Russia. The population was 12 as of 2002.

Geography 
Bykovo is located 58 km northwest of Vozhega (the district's administrative centre) by road. Pilyevo is the nearest rural locality.

References 

Rural localities in Vozhegodsky District